Kitagawa Tsukimaro was a Japanese ukiyo-e artist.  He was one of the most successful students of Kitagawa Utamaro ( – 1806), from whom he took the -maro.  His early works bear the name "Kikumaro", first written  (kiku meaning "chrysanthemum") until 1802, then  (kiku meaning "joy eternal") until he changed it in 1804 to "Tsukimaro" (tsuki meaning "moon").

Little is known of Tsukimaro's life.  His personal name was Jun and he had other nicknames ( or ).  He worked as a watchman in Kodenmachō Sanchōme in Edo (modern Tokyo), and at some point apprenticed under Utamaro.  He specialized in bijin-ga portrait prints of female beauties.  In 1804 he was one of the artists along with Utamaro who were arrested and manacled for making illegal prints of the 16th-century military leader Toyotomi Hideyoshi.  Around 1820 he changed his name to Kansetsu and turned to scroll paintings in the Maruyama–Maruyama–Shijō style.  His last dated work is an illustration for a kyōka poetry anthology of 1836.  He also used the art names Sumitei and Shūsai.

References

Works cited

External links

18th-century births
19th-century deaths
18th-century Japanese artists
19th-century Japanese artists
Ukiyo-e artists